Salou is a municipality of the comarca of Tarragonès, in the province of Tarragona, in Catalonia, Spain. The city is approximately 10 km from Tarragona and Reus on the Costa Daurada and 112 km from Barcelona.

Founded by the Greeks in the 6th century B.C., the coastal town was a notable commercial port during medieval and modern ages. Throughout the 20th century, Salou became an important European tourist attraction.

Aside from its string of beaches interrupted by rocky coves, and its landscaped promenade, one of its main attractions is the PortAventura World resort. The Dutch movie Costa! and the television series with the same title were both filmed in Salou.

History

Used as a port by Greeks (who named it Salauris) and Romans, it appeared again in an important historic event, when in 1229 the fleet of James I of Aragon departed from the port of Salou to conquer the Balearic Islands, thus creating the Kingdom of Majorca.

In 1286 Alfons III of Aragon also departed from this port to conquer Menorca, the last Moorish territory of the Balearic Islands.

Later, Salou became a nest of pirates. After that it was considered an unsafe place, so in 1530 Archbishop of Tarragona decided to erect a new defence tower, now called Torre Vella.

In 1865 the railway station began to operate, opening a new development time, that led one hundred years later to a tourist boom that has brought prosperity to the town. Salou was separated from the adjacent municipality of Vila-seca on 30 October 1989 by a decision of the Supreme Court of Spain.

In the summer of 2001, Salou suffered a terrorist attack by ETA, through a car bomb near a hotel. 13 people were injured, including two civil guards.

Main sights

Historic buildings and monuments

 Church of Santa Maria del Mar, built in 18th-century and enlarged after 1950.
 Torre Vella, a tower built in the 16th century
 Harbour-master's Office
 Jaume I monument
 Font lluminosa fountain 
 Monument to Fishermen
 Old Carrilet Railway Station

PortAventura World

PortAventura World is a growing theme park resort on the Costa Daurada. The resort includes luxury four-star accommodation, two theme parks (PortAventura Park and Ferrari Land), PortAventura Caribe Aquatic Park, a convention centre and a RV park. The PortAventura Park's main attractions are the Dragon Khan, a massive B&M mega-looper; Furius Baco, which is one of the fastest roller coasters in Europe; and Hurakan Condor, a tall falling-tower ride which is 100 metres tall. In 2012 a new roller coaster called Shambhala opened adjacent to the Dragon Khan. The park also has a grand multi-media show, called the FiestaAventura, every night between the end of June and the end of August which features fireworks, fountains and parade floats. Ferrari Land, with the highest and fastest vertical accelerator in Europe, opened in 2017, and will also include the world's first Ferrari hotel.

Lumine Mediterranea Beach & Golf Community

Salou is also home to the Lumine Golf Club (formerly known as PortAventura golf). There are three courses, labeled as north, south, and central. North and central were designed by Greg Norman and the south course was designed by "Green Project". The facilities consist of two clubhouses, a beach club, Lumine restaurant, Hoyo 19 restaurant, a pro shop, rental services and a golf school. In the future the area surrounding the golf course will be developed into a community with six residential areas and services that include two five-star hotels, a sports area and the International School of Salou that will cater for up to 1200 students as part of the Lumine community.

Auditorium Theatre of Salou

The Auditorium Theatre of Salou (Teatre Auditori de Salou) is an important part of the local community in terms of cultural and leisure in the municipality. The theatre plays local events such as political, school and cultural events and has also welcomed famous musicians to the area such as Sergio Dalma.

Beaches

Salou's main promenade is the Passeig Jaume I, which runs along the coast adjacent to the Llevant Beach, the longest beach in the town. Other beaches include Platja de Ponent, Platja dels Capellans, Platja Llarga and Platja Cala Crancs. Salou has 34 Blue Flag beaches. Water-sports, rentals and trips can be arranged on the Llevant Beach.

Sport tourism

Salou has been used since 2005 as the base for Rally Catalunya, part of the World Rally Championship. Salou has also held volleyball championships, football tournaments, a triathlon  and many other competitive sports.

Saloufest is the University sports festival which takes place on two separate occasions in April on an annual basis. The festival includes DJs and parties at the neighbouring resort's nightclub called Pacha.

In the future, the local government is expected to position Salou as a sport tourism destination and therefore will promote different projects that include first class facilities to provide the city with the necessary resources to become a tourist destination that attracts , especially in low season. They have announced a project that will feature swimming pools, football fields and tennis courts.
In April 2012 the Mayor of Salou inaugurated the facilities that have been built, which are six football fields (four artificial and 2 natural) including changing rooms, bar, waiting rooms and rooms for training sessions the second phase includes a further 6 more open fields, billiards room and shop selling merchandise.

Salou is the sub-site for the 2018 Mediterranean Games for sports such as sailing.

Climate

Salou has a Mediterranean climate (Köppen climate classification: Csa) characterized by mild winters and hot summers. The rainiest season is autumn, and the driest season is the summer. Salou receives above 2,500 hours of sunshine annually.

Local Festivals

 Cavalcade of the Three Kings (January)
 Cós Blanc (Winter festival; first weekend of February)
 International draughts tournament "Salou Open" (May)
 Children's Festival (June)
 St. John's Eve (Late June)
 Nits Daurades (Summer festival, week of 15 August)
 King Jaume I Festival (7 September)
 National Day of Catalonia (11 September)
 Festa de la Segregació (30 October)

Transport

Airport
Salou's closest airport is Reus (which it is connected to by a regular bus service) followed by Barcelona. Reus Airport is mainly served by the low cost airline Ryanair. The major charter airlines from Britain use Reus throughout the summer as a gateway to the Costa Daurada. The airport mainly serves British and Irish destinations, but domestic and other European destinations are also served.

Railway
Salou used to have a railway station served by the Spanish state rail-network, RENFE. The destinations from Salou included major cities in Catalonia such as Tarragona and Barcelona, as well as a train south to the city of Valencia. The station was closed in January 2020 after a new line between Tarragona and Amposta was built.

Some regional trains now terminate at the station Salou - Port Aventura to the north east of the city centre, which opened in 1996 soon after the inauguration of PortAventura. The station is connected to Tarragona and Barcelona by line R17.

Taxi
There are plenty of taxi services throughout the area including taxi ranks in locations such as opposite the Font lluminosa, Cap Salou and Reus Airport.

Bus
The bus company that serves the area is called Plana Bus, the destinations include Cambrils, La Pineda, PortAventura, Reus and Tarragona.

Gallery

Sources
The Book of Deeds of James I of Aragon (available in PDF format)
Ramon Muntaner,  Chronicle, tr. Lady Goodenough (available in PDF format).

References

External links 

Salou Tourist Board
Government data pages 

Municipalities in Tarragonès
Populated places in Tarragonès
Seaside resorts in Spain
Greek colonies in Iberia
Ancient Greek archaeological sites in Spain